Pouget may refer to:

Places

 Château Pouget, winery in the Margaux appellation of the Bordeaux region of France
 Le Pouget, commune in the Hérault department in the Languedoc-Roussillon region in southern France
 Le Pouget (power station), hydroelectric power station located at Le Truel, on the River Tarn, in the department of Aveyron in France

People with the surname

 Bertrand du Pouget (1280–1352), French papal diplomat and Cardinal
 Christian Pouget (born 1966), French ice hockey player
 Cyrille Pouget (born 1972), French soccer player
 Ely Pouget (born 1961), American actress and model
 Émile Pouget (1860–1931), French anarcho-communist
 Guillaume Pouget (1847–1933), French Vincentian priest 
 Jean-François-Albert du Pouget (1818–1904), French anthropologist and palaeontologist
 Jules Pouget (1884-1963), French politician
 Pouget (cyclist), a French cyclist